The Philippine House Committee on Foreign Affairs, or House Foreign Affairs Committee is a standing committee of the Philippine House of Representatives.

Jurisdiction 
As prescribed by House Rules, the committee's jurisdiction includes the following:
 Diplomatic and consular services
 Other international organizations and agencies
 Relations of the Philippines with other countries
 United Nations and its agencies

Members, 18th Congress

Historical members

18th Congress

Vice Chairperson 
 Francisco Datol Jr. (SENIOR CITIZENS)

See also 
 House of Representatives of the Philippines
 List of Philippine House of Representatives committees
 Department of Foreign Affairs
 Foreign relations of the Philippines

Notes

References

External links 
House of Representatives of the Philippines

Foreign Affairs
Parliamentary committees on Foreign Affairs